George Browne (1583–1631) was an English lawyer, landowner and politician who sat in the House of Commons at various times between 1614 and 1629.

Browne was the son of John Browne of Frampton, Dorset. He matriculated at Magdalen College, Oxford, on 13 October  1598, aged 15 and was awarded B.A. from University College, Oxford, on 12 May 1602. He was called to the bar at Middle Temple in 1609. In 1614, he was elected Member of Parliament for Lyme Regis in the Addled Parliament. He was of Symondsbury, Dorset, and Taunton Castle, Somerset. In 1626 he was elected MP for Taunton. He was Lent reader at Middle Temple in 1628. He was re-elected MP for Taunton in 1628 and sat until 1629 when King Charles decided to rule without parliament for eleven years.

References

1583 births
1631 deaths
17th-century English landowners
Alumni of Magdalen College, Oxford
Alumni of University College, Oxford
Members of the Middle Temple
17th-century English lawyers
English MPs 1614
English MPs 1626
English MPs 1628–1629